Nanakaly Hospital for Hematology & Oncology is a government hospital  located  near No Shahed Martyr mosque, in Azady, Hawler, Kurdistan region, Iraq. It treats patients with blood disease, leukemia, and hemophilia. It was built by Ahmad Ismail Nanakaly and opened on 16 May 2004.

Departments

 Management
 Emergency 
 Laboratory
 Pediatric
 Hemophilia
 Oncology
 Others (driver, storage, kitchen)

External links
http://www.xing.com/net/iraq/health-care-213182/nanakaly-hospital-dr-sami-salih-12836876

Hospital buildings completed in 2004
Hospitals in Iraq